13 Queens Boulevard is an American sitcom that aired from March 20 until July 24, 1979.

Premise
The series was about the diverse residents of a Queens apartment complex.

The major residents of the complex were Felicia and Steven Winters (Eileen Brennan and Jerry Van Dyke) who have been happily married for over 15 years.  Also living in the complex were Elaine Dowling (Marcia Rodd), a divorcee who was Felicia's best friend; and the Capestros, which included Mildred (Helen Page Camp) and her daughters, Annie (Susan Elliott) and Jill (Louise Williams). Others in the complex included Camille (Karen Rushmore) and Lois (Frances Lee McCain).

Cast
Eileen Brennan as Felicia Winters
Jerry Van Dyke as Steven Winters
Marcia Rodd as Elaine Dowling
Helen Page Camp as Mildred Capestro
Susan Elliot as Annie Capestro
Louise Williams as Jill Capestro
Karen Rushmore as Camille
Frances Lee McCain as Lois

Production 
Richard Baer created the program; Bernie Orenstein, Saul Turteltaub, and Bud Yorkin developed it. Peter Baldwin, Nancy Walker, Kim Friedman, and Will MacKenzie directed. Writers were Orenstein, Turteltaub, Baer, Linda Marsh, Martin Rips, and Mitzi McCall.

Episodes

References

External links
 
 

1979 American television series debuts
1979 American television series endings
1970s American sitcoms
English-language television shows
American Broadcasting Company original programming
Television shows set in Queens
Television series by Sony Pictures Television